Adebayo Adeleye (born 17 May 2000) is a Nigerian professional footballer who plays as a goalkeeper for Hapoel Jerusalem.

Club career
In August 2019, Adeleye made his senior debut for Hapoel Jerusalem in a match against Hapoel Rishon LeZion. The following season, he helped his club to promotion to the Israeli Premier League with 19 clean sheets after they finished as runners-up in the Liga Leumit. Following promotion, he made his professional debut in August 2021, keeping a clean sheet in a 0–0 draw with Hapoel Nof HaGalil.

International career
Adeleye was part of the Nigeria U17 in 2017. In June 2022, he received his first call-up to the senior squad.

References

External links

Profile at Israeli FA

2000 births
Living people
Nigerian footballers
Hapoel Katamon Jerusalem F.C. players
Hapoel Jerusalem F.C. players
Liga Leumit players
Israeli Premier League players
Nigerian expatriate footballers
Expatriate footballers in Israel
Nigerian expatriate sportspeople in Israel
Association football goalkeepers
Nigeria youth international footballers